The Augustus Barié Property is a home in Savannah, Georgia, United States. It is located at 222 East Jones Street.

The building is part of the Savannah Historic District, and in a survey for the Historic Savannah Foundation, Mary Lane Morrison found the building to be of significant status.

It was built for Augustus Montfort Barié in (1815–1904) in 1857, and sold to George Dillon at year's end for $5,500. By 1859, Dillon had sold the property to John Cunningham, who kept it until 1873.

See also
Buildings in Savannah Historic District

References

Houses in Savannah, Georgia
Houses completed in 1857
Savannah Historic District